Mokuan may refer to:

Mokuan Reien (died 1345), Japanese painter during the Muromachi Period
Muyan (Japanese: Mokuan Shoto, 1611–1684), Chinese Chan monk and a founder of the Ōbaku Zen school in Japan